Martin Phillips may refer to:

 Martin Phillips (footballer) (born 1976), English footballer
 Martin Phillips (darts player) (born 1960), Welsh darts player
 Martin Phillipps, New Zealand musician with The Chills